is a public university in the city of Nonoichi in Ishikawa Prefecture, Japan. The predecessor of the school was founded in 1971 as an agricultural junior college, and it was chartered as a university in 2005.

External links
 Official website 

Educational institutions established in 1971
Public universities in Japan
Universities and colleges in Ishikawa Prefecture
1971 establishments in Japan
Nonoichi, Ishikawa